Xerocrassa ferreri is a species of air-breathing land snail, a pulmonate gastropod mollusk in the family Geomitridae. 

Subspecies
 Xerocrassa ferreri ferreri (S. H. F. Jaeckel, 1952)
 Xerocrassa ferreri pobrensis (Gasull, 1964)

Distribution

This species is endemic to the Balearic Islands in Spain.

References

 Jaeckel, S.H.F. (1952). Die Mollusken der spanischen Mittelmeer-Inseln. Mitteilungen aus dem Zoologischen Museum der Humboldt-Universität Berlin. 28: 54-143, 4 plates. Berlin.
 Graack, W. (2005). Die Gattung Xerocrassa Monterosato 1892 (Mollusca, Hygromiidae) von Mallorca. Schriften zur Malakozoologie. 22: 1-64.

ferreri
Molluscs of Europe
Endemic fauna of the Balearic Islands
Gastropods described in 1952